Rabbit Run is a tributary of the Delaware River contained wholly within Solebury Township, Bucks County, Pennsylvania.

Statistics
The Geographic Information System I.D. is 1184568. U.S. Department of the Interior Geological Survey I.D. is 03065.

Course
Rabbit Run rises in Solebury Township from two unnamed ponds adjacent to U.S. Route 202, flowing generally northeast passing through the Pat Livezey Park, meeting its confluence with the Delaware River a short distance south of the bridge carrying U.S. Route 202.

Municipalities
Bucks County
Solebury Township

Crossings and Bridges
 U.S. Route 202 (Lower York Road)
 Business Route 202 (Lower York Road)
Pennsylvania Route 32 (River Road)
Lower York Road (business Route 202)
U.S. Route 202 (Lower York Road)

References

Rivers of Bucks County, Pennsylvania
Rivers of Pennsylvania
Tributaries of the Delaware River